Woodlands Stadium is a multi-use stadium in Lusaka, Zambia.  It is currently used mostly for football matches and serves as the home for City of Lusaka F.C. of the Zambian National Division One.  The stadium holds about 10,000.

External links
Stadium information

Football venues in Zambia
Buildings and structures in Lusaka
Sport in Lusaka